Sharon McKenzie (born May 16, 1937) is an American ice dancer. With partner Bert Wright, she is the 1957 U.S. national champion. They won the bronze medal at the 1957 World Figure Skating Championships.

Results
(with Bert Wright)

References

American female ice dancers
1937 births
Living people
World Figure Skating Championships medalists
21st-century American women